Vasile Pinciu (born 9 April 1932) is a Romanian equestrian. He competed in two events at the 1960 Summer Olympics.

References

1932 births
Living people
Romanian male equestrians
Olympic equestrians of Romania
Equestrians at the 1960 Summer Olympics
People from Giurgiu County